Signs Under Test is the tenth full-length release for the California-based techno DJ/producer John Tejada. It was released on February 2, 2015 on Kompakt.

Track listing

References 

2015 albums
John Tejada albums
Kompakt albums